"The Terror from the Depths" is a short story  by American writer Fritz Leiber, part of the Cthulhu Mythos genre of horror fiction. It was begun in 1937 but not finished until 1975; it was first published in the anthology The Disciples of Cthulhu in 1976.

Summary
The story begins with a note that this manuscript was found inside a container, which was sold at an auction.
The story's narrator is George Reuter Fischer, who was born on April 30, 1912 in Louisville, Kentucky. Fischer's father is a mason and stonecutter, who moves his family to Vulture's Roost, California near Hollywood. There, his father builds a mansion with strange stonecarvings. George, however, is troubled by strange dreams where he's in a tunnel as a blind worm-like being. In one of his nightmares, George realizes he's one of the monsters and, in another dream, he sees himself being eaten by those monsters. George eventually finds a way to prevent these dreams. During a hike with his son one afternoon, Fischer's father is killed after he suddenly falls off a cliff. Years later, when Fischer is attending Miskatonic University, he's forced to leave the college soon after due to a combination of factors including nervousness, homesickness, actual ailment, increased hours of sleep, and sleepwalking.

Short stories by Fritz Leiber
1975 short stories
Fantasy short stories